Sajenko the Soviet (German: Die geheime Macht) is a 1928 German silent drama film directed by Erich Waschneck and starring Michael Bohnen, Suzy Vernon and Walter Rilla. It was shot at the Babelsberg Studios in Berlin. The film's sets were designed by the art director Jacek Rotmil.

Cast
 Michael Bohnen as Sajenko 
 Suzy Vernon as Prinzessin Sinaide  
 Walter Rilla as Mirow, Sekretär des Handelsbüros  
 Henry Stuart as Edward, der Sohn von P.L. Harland  
 Truus van Aalten as Lilian, Edwards Schwester  
 Paul Otto as Major Raschoff  
 Ferdinand von Alten as Baron Sterny  
 Rudolf Biebrach as Admiral Reeve  
 Leopold Kramer as Fürst Balyzin  
 Max Magnus as Leutnant Daboro  
 Max Maximilian as Pferdeknecht Kosma  
 Alexander Murski 
 Ossip Darmatow

References

Bibliography
 Bock, Hans-Michael & Bergfelder, Tim. The Concise CineGraph. Encyclopedia of German Cinema. Berghahn Books, 2009.

External links

1928 films
Films of the Weimar Republic
Films directed by Erich Waschneck
German silent feature films
UFA GmbH films
German black-and-white films
1928 drama films
German drama films
1920s German films
Films shot at Babelsberg Studios